The 1960 United States Senate election in West Virginia was held on November 8, 1960. Incumbent Democratic U.S. Senator Jennings Randolph won re-election to a full term.

Primary elections 
Primary elections were held on May 10, 1960.

Democratic primary

Candidate 
 Jennings Randolph, incumbent U.S. Senator

Results

Republican primary

Candidate 
 Cecil H. Underwood, incumbent Governor

Results

General election

Result

See also 
 1960 United States Senate elections

References

Bibliography 
 

West Virginia
1960
United States Senate